Lake Pyar is a Burmese crime detective action television series. It aired on Canal+ Zat Lenn, on every Thursday at 20:00. Season 1: A Sword of Truth aired from October 17 to December 5, 2019 for 8 episodes and season 2: Light and Dark aired from January 28 to March 18, 2021 for 8 episodes.

Synopsis
It is about the case of a female lieutenant colonel who is good at drawing conclusions.  But what happens when Lake Pyar later finds out that her aunt is the killer of her mother, and what if her father and mother are notorious criminals in the notorious Mafia?

Cast
Pan Yaung Chel as Lake Pyar
Khar Ra as Htun Ko
Myat Noe Aye as Myat Noe
Aung Ye Htike as Paing Soe
Charlie as Myo Min
Min Oo as U Arkar

Award
Best Theme Song or Title Theme Award for season 1 (Asian Academy Creative Award 2020)

References

Burmese television series